Stanislav Valentinovich Volzhentsev (born 29 October 1985 in Orsk, Soviet Union) is a Russian cross-country skier.

He competed at the FIS Nordic World Ski Championships 2011 in Oslo, and placed fourth in 15 kilometre classical.

Cross-country skiing results
All results are sourced from the International Ski Federation (FIS).

Olympic Games

World Championships

World Cup

Season standings

Individual podiums

1 podium – (1 )

Team podiums

 1 podium – (1 )

References

External links

1985 births
Living people
Russian male cross-country skiers
Tour de Ski skiers
Cross-country skiers at the 2014 Winter Olympics
Olympic cross-country skiers of Russia